Sec61, termed SecYEG in prokaryotes, is a membrane protein complex found in all domains of life. As the core component of the translocon, it transports proteins to the endoplasmic reticulum in eukaryotes and out of the cell in prokaryotes. It is a doughnut-shaped pore through the membrane with 3 different subunits (heterotrimeric), SecY (α), SecE (γ), and SecG (β). It has a region called the plug that blocks transport into or out of the ER. This plug is displaced when the hydrophobic region of a nascent polypeptide interacts with another region of Sec61 called the seam, allowing translocation of the polypeptide into the ER lumen.

Structure 

Much of the knowledge on the structure of the SecY/Sec61α pore comes from an X-ray crystallography structure of its archaeal version. The large SecY subunit consists of two halves, trans-membrane segments 1-5 and trans-membrane segments 6-10. They are linked at the extracellular side by a loop between trans-membrane segments 5 and 6. SecY can open laterally at the front (lateral gate). SecE is a single spanning membrane protein in most species. It sits at the back of SecY, wrapping around the two halves of SecY. Secβ (SecG) is not essential. Its sits on the side of SecY and makes only few contacts with it. In a side view, the channel has an hourglass shape, with a cytoplasmic funnel that is empty, and an extracellular funnel that is filled with a little helix, called the plug. In the middle of the membrane is a construction, formed from a pore ring of hydrophobic amino acids that project their side chains inwards. During protein translocation, the plug is moved out of the way, and a polypeptide chain is moved from the cytoplasmic funnel, through the pore ring, the extracellular funnel, into the extracellular space. Hydrophobic segments of membrane proteins exit sideways through the lateral gate into the lipid phase and become membrane-spanning segments.

By taxon 

The bacterial SecYEG channel interacts with the signal sequences of secretory proteins as well as SecA, an ATPase which drives translocation. SecY is an integral plasma membrane membrane protein of 419 to 492 amino acid residues that typically contains 10 transmembrane (TM), 6 cytoplasmic and 5 periplasmic regions.

Instead of SecA, eukaryotic translocon can use the ER-lumenal chaperone BiP to drive translocation.

The archaeal translocon is less understood. It might use SecDF-YajC and YidC like bacteria, as homologs have been found. An ATPase is yet to be identified.

Species-specifics
Human proteins:
 SecY: SEC61A1, SEC61A2
 SecG: SEC61B
 SecE: SEC61G

Budding yeast have two such homologous complexes; the essential one is named Sec61, and the non-essential one is called Ssh1. Like Sec61, Ssh1 does dock to the ribosome.

See also 
 SecY protein
 Translocon
 Protein targeting

References 

Alberts, Bruce et al. Molecular Biology of the Cell. Garland, 2002.

External links 
 

Integral membrane proteins
Secretion